Dairon Blanco LaMadrid (born April 26, 1993) is a Cuban professional baseball outfielder in the Kansas City Royals organization. He made his MLB debut in 2022.

Career
Blanco began his professional career in the Cuban National Series, playing for the Ganaderos de Camaguey,
Industriales de La Habana, and the Alazanes de Granma from 2012 through 2016. He defected from the Cuba in May 2016.

Oakland Athletics
Blanco signed with the Oakland Athletics on April 2, 2018. He spent the 2018 season with the Stockton Ports, hitting .291/.342/.406/.748 with 1 home run, 37 RBI, and 22 stolen bases. He opened the 2019 season with the Midland RockHounds, hitting .276/.342/.468/.811 with 7 home runs, 44 RBI, and 27 stolen bases.

Kansas City Royals
On July 27, 2019, Blanco and Ismael Aquino were traded to the Kansas City Royals in exchange for Jake Diekman. He finished the 2019 season with the Northwest Arkansas Naturals, hitting .230/.282/.302/.583 with 5 RBI and 6 stolen bases. Blanco did not play in 2020 due to the cancellation of the Minor League Baseball season because of the COVID-19 pandemic. Blanco split the 2021 season between Northwest Arkansas and the Omaha Storm Chasers, hitting a combined .277/.350/.441/.791 with 14 home runs, 53 RBI, and 41 stolen bases. 

On May 19, 2022, Kansas City selected Blanco's contract to the active roster as a COVID-19 replacement. He made his MLB debut on May 20, recording his first career hit. He appeared in 5 games for Kansas City, going 2-for-7 in 7 plate appearances. On June 3, 2022 Blanco was designated for assignment by the Royals. He cleared waivers and was sent outright to Triple-A Omaha on June 7.

See also
List of baseball players who defected from Cuba

References

External links

1993 births
Living people
People from Florida, Cuba
Major League Baseball players from Cuba
Major League Baseball outfielders
Kansas City Royals players
Ganaderos de Camaguey players
Industriales de La Habana players
Alazanes de Granma players
Stockton Ports players
Midland RockHounds players
Northwest Arkansas Naturals players
Omaha Storm Chasers players
Cuban expatriate baseball players in the Dominican Republic
Cuban expatriate baseball players in Mexico
Cuban expatriate baseball players in the United States
Criollos de Caguas players
Toros del Este players
Tomateros de Culiacán players